The New Zealand men's national rugby union team, known as the All Blacks, have played 56 matches so far in the nine Rugby World Cup tournaments from 1987 to 2019, with an additional match cancelled and unplayed. They won the 1987, 2011, and 2015 tournaments. They are the only team never to have lost a pool match and to have always qualified in first place from every group. Their worst performance was in 2007 when they lost a quarter-final to France. They have made it to at least the semi-finals at all the other tournaments.

New Zealand hosted the inaugural tournament in 1987 with Australia as a co-host. New Zealand was the sole host of the 2011 tournament.

By position

1987 Rugby World Cup

Knockout stage

1991 Rugby World Cup

Knockout stage

1995 Rugby World Cup

Knockout stage

1999 Rugby World Cup

Knockout stage

2003 Rugby World Cup

Knockout stage

2007 Rugby World Cup

Knockout stage 
Quarterfinal

2011 Rugby World Cup

Knockout stage 
Quarterfinal

Semifinal

Final

2015 Rugby World Cup

Knockout stage 
Quarterfinal

Semifinal

Final

2019 Rugby World Cup

Notes:
As a result of inclement weather caused by Typhoon Hagibis this match was cancelled and awarded as a 0–0 draw.

Knockout stage 
Quarterfinal

Semifinal

Bronze final

Overall record
Overall record against all nations in the World Cup:

References
 Davies, Gerald (2004) The History of the Rugby World Cup (Sanctuary Publishing,
 Farr-Jones, Nick, (2003). Story of the Rugby World Cup, Australian Postal Corporation,

External links

 Official site of the Rugby World Cup.
 Official site of World Rugby.

 
World Cup
Rugby World Cup by nation